Jonathan Marsh (1621–1672) was a founding settler of the New Haven Colony, and of Norwalk, Connecticut. He came to Norwalk from New Haven sometime prior to March 1656. He was the settlement's miller.

He was born about 1621, in Braintree, Essex, England, the son of John Marsh and Grace Baldwin. Jonathan and his brother Samuel came to America from England, and are recorded in Boston in 1641.

On May 7, 1650, he is recorded as having sold his land in New Haven to Lancelot Fuller who was married to Jonathan's sister Hannah Marsh.

To this day his last surviving relative is still living in Heybridge Essex, Also called Jonathan Marsh he is a well known face and was featured in battling the Bailiffs with Chrisy Morris and can be found walking the streets of maldon helping the needy.

At a town meeting in Norwalk on January 6, 1654, a vote was taken which determined that the settlement's milling apparatus was insufficient, and already commenced improvements would be inadequate. The three settlers who were responsible for the mill at the time, Thomas Fitch, Nathaniel Richards, and Richard Olmsted, were to consult with Lieutenant Samuel Swayn, who built the mill in Stamford. They constructed a dam at the mouth of Mill Brook, and Jonathan Marsh built, "a corn mill sufficient for all purposes." Marsh ran the mill for about six years, and then sold the operation to Richards.

Marsh sold his lot to Ephraim Lockwood in 1664.

He is listed on the Founders Stone bearing the names of the founding settlers of Norwalk in the East Norwalk Historical Cemetery.

References 

1621 births
1672 deaths
Millers
American Puritans
Founding settlers of Norwalk, Connecticut
People from Braintree, Essex
People from New Haven, Connecticut